"Fool For Your Love" is a song written by Don Singleton, and recorded by American country music artist Mickey Gilley.  It was released in March 1983 as the first single and title track from the album Fool for Your Love.  The song was Gilley's sixteenth number one country single as a solo artist.  The single went to number one for one week and spent a total of twelve weeks on the country chart.

Charts

Weekly charts

Year-end charts

References

1983 singles
1983 songs
Mickey Gilley songs
Song recordings produced by Jim Ed Norman
Epic Records singles